"Day by Day" is a popular song with music by Axel Stordahl and Paul Weston and lyrics by Sammy Cahn.

1946 recordings
Chart versions in 1946 were by Frank Sinatra (recorded on August 22, 1945, and released in January 1946); Jo Stafford; Les Brown & His Orchestra (Day By Day / Doctor, Lawyer, Indian Chief , Columbia, 1946) - vocal: Doris Day.; and Bing Crosby with Mel Tormé and His Mel-Tones.

Other recorded versions
 The Four Freshmen, (Single, Capitol, 1955) - with orchestra conducted by Dick Reynolds, 
 Doris Day (Day by Day, 1957)
 Frank Sinatra (Come Swing with Me, 1961)
 Astrud Gilberto (The Shadow of Your Smile, 1965)
 Carmen McRae (Portrait of Carmen, 1967)
 Kimiko Kasai, (Satin Doll, CBS/Sony, 1972) - with Gil Evans Orchestra
 Trudy Desmond (Tailor Made, 1991)
 Grady Tate (TNT - Grady Tate Sings, 1991)
 Stevie Holland (More Than Words Can Say, 2006)
 Eliane Elias (Bossa Nova Stories, 2008)
 Ernestine Anderson (A Song for You, 2009)
 Carol Welsman (Alone Together, 2015)

References

Songs with lyrics by Sammy Cahn
Songs with music by Axel Stordahl
Jo Stafford songs
Shirley Bassey songs
Bing Crosby songs
Frank Sinatra songs
Ella Fitzgerald songs
Caterina Valente songs
Mel Tormé songs
Songs written by Paul Weston
Jazz standards